Konstantin Severyanovich Galkin (born 28 May 1961) is a Russian professional football coach.

Honours
 Russian Second Division, Zone Ural-Povolzhye best coach: 2010.

External links
  Career profile at Footballfacts
 Konstantin Galkin at Footballdatabase

1961 births
Sportspeople from Nizhny Novgorod
Living people
Russian football managers
FC Tyumen managers